The Gypsies of Svinia  is a 1998 documentary film about the Roma population in Svinia, Slovakia. The film documents the people within the community, and follows David Scheffel, a Canadian anthropologist, as he attempts to gain the support of charitable agencies the Heifer Project International, the Canadian International Development Agency, and Habitat for Humanity International.

The film was directed by John Paskievich, and produced by Joe MacDonald through  the National Film Board of Canada.

See also
 Roma in Slovakia

References

External links
 
 
The Gypsies of Svinia at the National Film Board of Canada

1998 films
1998 documentary films
Romani in Slovakia
National Film Board of Canada documentaries
Films directed by John Paskievich
Documentary films about Romani people
Prešov Region
1990s Canadian films